Allan Cuartas (born October 1, 2002) is an American soccer player who plays as a defender for USL League One club Fort Lauderdale CF as a member of the Inter Miami academy.

Career

Fort Lauderdale CF
Cuartas made his league debut for the club on August 8, 2020, coming on as an 82nd-minute substitute for Edison Azcona in a 2–1 away victory over Tormenta FC.

References

External links
Allan Cuartas at US Soccer Development Academy

2002 births
Living people
American sportspeople of Colombian descent
American soccer players
Soccer players from Miami
Association football defenders
Inter Miami CF II players
USL League One players